Sonam  Lhosar is a new year festival of the hyolmo and tamang people of Nepal and the Sikkim and Darjeeling regions of India. It falls on the second new moon after the winter solstice which is usually the Magh Sukla Pratipada based on the eastern lunar calendar. 

Years are associated with 12 different animals - Rat, Ox, Tiger, Rabbit, Eagle, Snake, Horse, Goat/Sheep, Monkey, Rooster, Dog, and Boar. Historically, the festival is celebrated after harvesting the crops.

Activities
In Sonam Lhosar the Hyolmo people visit monasteries and stupas sacrifice themselves meanwhile  special rituals with mask dance are performed to drive away evil spirits. The houses and surroundings are cleaned to welcome gods and goddesses. 

Beef, pork, chicken, mutton, fish, and sweet desserts are consumed in the Sonam Lhosar. Khapsey and Babar (kind a like chapati but made of rice) and Thongsey are mainly eaten in Hyolmo Community. 

People wear traditional dresses and jewellery to participate in cultural events and exchange the greetings with each another. Tamang Selo and the Damphu is played in the festival for dance. Syabru is commonly dance in Hyolmo Community.

See also
 Sonam Lhosar , new year of Hyolmo people
 Gyalpo Lhosar, new year of Sherpa people
Tamu Lhosar, new year of Gurung people
Lhosar, new year of Tibet
Sonam Lhochar , new year of tamang people

References

External links
Photos

Festivals in Nepal
New Year celebrations
Buddhist festivals in Nepal
Buddhist festivals in India
New Year in India
Tamang culture